"History Lesson – Part II" is a song from the 1984 album Double Nickels on the Dime by the American rock band Minutemen. The song, written by Mike Watt, is about the relationship of singer D. Boon and Watt as they played music together.

The song is subtitled "Part II" as an earlier Minutemen composition titled "History Lesson" was included on their 1981 release, The Punch Line. Watt claims he wrote the song to humanize themselves.

Lyrics
The song was penned by Watt and, as such, makes specific reference to Boon in the third person ("me and D. Boon, we played for years").  However, when the song was recorded, Boon performed lead vocals and changed the third person references to Watt ("me and Mike Watt, we played for years").  The lyrics, as printed on the cover of Double Nickels on the Dime, contain the original references to Boon despite the difference in the actual recording.

Additional references are made to E. Bloom of Blue Öyster Cult, Richard Hell of the Voidoids, Joe Strummer of The Clash, and John Doe of X, as well as to Bob Dylan.

Legacy
The song's iconic first line was used as the title of the book Our Band Could Be Your Life: Scenes from the American Indie Underground, 1981–1991, by Michael Azerrad.

The first stanza of the song also includes the line "Punk rock changed our lives." The band Sublime sampled this line for their song "Waiting for My Ruca" on their debut album 40oz. to Freedom.

Mat Honan of Gizmodo has claimed the DIY ethos of the band as epitomized in this song "is a hacker mindset. It is geek-forward."

References

1984 songs
American punk rock songs
Minutemen (band) songs
Sequel songs